The Glacier Bay wolf spider (Pardosa diuturna) is a species of spider in the family Lycosidae. It is endemic to Canada and Alaska.

References

Pardosa
Spiders of North America
Fauna of Alaska
Fauna of the United States
Taxonomy articles created by Polbot
Taxa named by Wade Fox